is a Japanese television drama starting on Fuji TV on 10 May 2010. The drama is known also under the Japanese short name .

Synopsis
Hazuki Rensuke (Kimura Takuya), the president of Regolith, a luxury furniture company, is determined to increase his company's market share in the house furnishing business.

Cast
Kimura Takuya as Hazuki Rensuke
Shinohara Ryoko as Ninomiya Maemi
Lin Chi-ling as Liu Xiu Mei 
Matsuda Shota as Sai Kazami/Cai Feng Jian
Kitagawa Keiko as Onuki Yuzuki
Watanabe Ikkei as Kijihata Togo
Hamada Gaku as Maehara Tsuguo
Mikami Kensei as Koizumi Keiichi
Nishiyama Maki as Eruka
Mitsushima Hikari as Anzai Rina
Nakamura Yuri as Kasahara Yuki
Tsuyoshi Abe as Min
Nagatsuka Kyozo as Onuki Shogen
Nukumizu Youichi as Tokita Ikuzo
Takenaka Naoto as Maruyama Tetsuji
Kabira Jay as Mineoka Yasuyuki

Ratings

References

External links
 Official website 
 

Japanese drama television series
2010 Japanese television series debuts
2010 Japanese television series endings
Fuji TV dramas